Sui Gas Field is a natural gas field near Sui in Balochistan Province, Pakistan that is operated by Pakistan Petroleum Limited.

Production
The Sui Gas Field is considered to be the largest natural gas field in Pakistan with 1.6 trillion cubic feet reserve estimates as of 2017. In 2007, the Sui Gas Field accounted for 17% of Pakistan's total gas production.

Protective measures
The Sui Gas pipelines are a frequent target of terrorist attacks. As a protective measure, Chief of Army Staff Ashfaq Pervez Kayani ordered Frontier Corps (FC) to take charge of the Sui Gas Fields in 2011.

See also
 Sui Northern Gas Pipelines Limited
 Sui Southern Gas Company

References

External links

Dera Bugti District
Natural gas fields in Pakistan
Geography of Balochistan, Pakistan
Energy in Balochistan, Pakistan